Marzio di Colantonio or di Colantonio Ganassini or di Cola Antonio  (c. 1580s – after 1623) was an Italian painter, as a painter of still-lifes and landscapes, and fresco decorations of grotteschi and battle scenes with small figures. His still-life paintings contain hunted game.

Biography
He was born in Rome, and trained initially under his father, a painter of Grotteschi. He is said to have then trained under Antonio Tempesta.

He painted some sacred subjects including frescoes for the church of Santa Maria della Consolazione of Rome, he was best known for his battle paintings, for which he was recruited by the  Cardinal of Savoy to work for a time in Piedmont for the House of Savoy. He died young in Viterbo.

Sources

16th-century Italian painters
Italian male painters
17th-century Italian painters
Renaissance painters
Italian still life painters
Italian battle painters
Mannerist painters
1583 births
1620s deaths